The Strawberry Mansion Bridge is a steel arch truss bridge across the Schuylkill River in Fairmount Park in Philadelphia, Pennsylvania.

It was built in 1896–1897 by the Phoenix Iron Company in Phoenixville, Pennsylvania, under private ownership by the Fairmount Park Transportation Company, which operated trolleys over the bridge, with pedestrian and carriage lanes on the north side. Trolley service was discontinued in 1946.

The Philadelphia Historical Commission designated the bridge as a historic structure on September 7, 1978.

From 1991 to 1995, the bridge was closed to vehicular and pedestrian traffic while it was restored to its historical appearance. As of 2010, the bridge remains in use, carrying vehicular and pedestrian traffic.

The Strawberry Mansion Bridge was featured in "Always Sunny in Philadelphia" S9 E12. During "Mac Day", the gang makes a Project Badass tape, featuring Mac (Ronald MacDonald) and Mac's cousin, Country Mac, jumping off the bridge into the water.

See also

Historic Strawberry Mansion, from which the bridge takes its name
List of bridges documented by the Historic American Engineering Record in Pennsylvania
List of crossings of the Schuylkill River

References

External links

West Fairmount Park
East Fairmount Park
Truss arch bridges in the United States
Bridges in Philadelphia
Bridges completed in 1897
Road bridges in Pennsylvania
Railroad bridges in Pennsylvania
Road-rail bridges in the United States
Bridges over the Schuylkill River
Historic American Engineering Record in Philadelphia
Historic American Buildings Survey in Philadelphia
Strawberry Mansion, Philadelphia
Steel bridges in the United States